Redeemer Presbyterian Church (PCA), is a church located in New York City, founded in 1989 by Timothy J. Keller, who retired as pastor in July 2017. The family of Redeemer churches includes Redeemer Downtown (Sr. Pastor John Lin), Redeemer West Side (Sr. Pastor David Bisgrove), Redeemer East Side (Sr. Pastor Abraham Cho), Redeemer Lincoln Square (Pastor Michael Keller), and Redeemer East Harlem (Pastor Justin Adour). Christianity Today called Redeemer "one of Manhattan's most vital congregations."

History

Redeemer draws around 5,000 people to its services each Sunday at venues on the Upper West Side, Upper East Side and Downtown. According to the church's 2014 annual report, the current total membership is 1,760. In a 2006 survey of 2,000 American Protestant church leaders, Redeemer was named the #16 most influential church in America. Redeemer has attracted members of the public such as young professionals, doctors, bankers, lawyers, artists, actors, musicians, and designers, many of whom are in their 20s and 30s.

In January 1998, a New York Times article about the church discussed its conservative stance, in that it condemned homosexuality and did not allow women to be ministers. In the article, current and former members of the congregation described the Redeemer church as intolerant, and "being full of fundamentalists and zealous, newly converted Christians pushing hard-line views". In response to the article, Tim and Kathy Keller wrote to The New York Times and claimed that the church was neither "hardline" nor "fundamentalist."

Through its church planting center, Redeemer has helped start over 100 smaller churches in the New York metropolitan area. With respect to planting and starting new churches in urban areas, The New York Times reported that "pastors from around the world are beginning to come in a steady stream to New York City to glean what they can from Dr. Keller and Redeemer." In 2012, the church bought a parking garage at 150 West 83rd Street on the Upper West Side for conversion to a church building of its own. The church has an office at 1166 Avenue of the Americas.

References

External links
 Redeemer Presbyterian Church
 Redeemer City to City
 Center for Faith and Work
 Gospel in Life - Sermons & Resources
 150w83 - Event Venue/Rental Space
 e-newsletter

Churches in Manhattan
Presbyterian churches in New York City
Presbyterian Church in America churches in New York (state)
Christian organizations established in 1989